Eastern Sierra Transit is the operator of public transportation for the Eastern Sierra Region in California (between the Sierra Nevada and the California state line). The agency operates both inter-city and local service. They also offer Dial-a-ride service to disabled passengers in all service areas and to the general public in areas where there is no scheduled fixed-route service. The Eastern Sierra Transit Authority was established in 2006 and took over the operations of Inyo Mono Transit in 2007.

References

External links
Official Eastern Sierra Transit Authority website

Bus transportation in California
Transportation in Inyo County, California
Transportation in Mono County, California
Transit agencies in California
Bishop, California
Owens Valley
Sierra Nevada (United States)
2006 establishments in California